Omar/Umar/Omer is a masculine given name that has different origins in Arabic, Hebrew and German.

Umar or Omar is a common name in Muslim Arab and Muslim populations in general. Omar is represented in Islamic traditions, meaning "flourishing, long lived".  The name dates back to the emergence and military success of Islam, which were partly due to the second caliph Umar ibn al-Khattab (also spelled Omar). 

There was also a biblical figure by the name of Omar in the Hebrew Bible, meaning "eloquent". Another similar Hebrew name is Omer, derived from "sheaf" or bundle of grain.

The name Omar is also used in  Spanish-speaking countries.  In the Middle Ages, there was a large population of Jews and Muslims in the Iberian Peninsula, therefore the name could have spread because of this.

The name Ómar is also popular as a man's name in Iceland, and to a much lesser extent in Nordic countries. The name can also be a variant of Ottomar or Othmar, a Germanic name consisting of elements *aud, meaning wealthy, and *mari, meaning fame. The name Omaar (أومار) is a Somali name, not a variant of Omar/Umar. It comes from the Somali word "Oomaar" which means "hot steam from boiling pot".

Given name

Omar
Omar I of Kanem, ruler of Kanem, Chad from 1372 to 1380
Omar I of the Maldives (died 1341), sultan of the Maldives from 1306 to 1341
Omar II of the Maldives (died 1484), sultan of the Maldives from 1480 to 1484
Omar Abdirashid Ali Sharmarke (born 1960), Somali diplomat and politician; former prime minister of Somalia
Omar Abdul Rahman (academic) (born 1932), Malaysian academic and corporate figure
Omar Abdullah, Indian politician from Jammu and Kashmir
Omar Abu-Riche (1910–1990), Syrian poet
Omar Ahmed, Kenyan boxer
Omar Atlas, former Venezuelan professional wrestler
Omar Ayuso (born 1998), Spanish actor
Omar Bakri Muhammad, Syrian Muslim militant who lived in the UK for 20 years and was later arrested as a terrorist
Omar Banos (born 1998, known professionally as Cuco), American singer-songwriter and record producer
Omar Barboza, Venezuelan politician
Omar al-Bashir (born 1944), former President of Sudan
Omar Benson Miller, American actor
Omar Bongo, President of Gabon (1967–2009)
Omar Bradley (1893-1981), American 5-star general, one of the main U.S. Army field commanders in North Africa and Europe during World War II
Omar Bradley (born 1958), mayor of Compton, California from 1993 until 2001
Omar Bravo, international Mexican football player
Omar Brown (disambiguation), multiple people
Omar Bugiel (born 1992), Lebanese footballer
Omar Bundy, career United States Army officer and general
Omar B. Bunnell, American businessman and politician
Omar Camporese (born 1968), former professional tennis player
Omar Chaparro, Mexican actor
Omar Cisneros, Cuban hurdler
Omar D. Conger (1818–1898), American politician
Omar Craddock, American triple jumper
Omar Abdallah Dakhqan (died 2012), Jordanian politician
Omar Diallo (born 1972), Senegalese football goalkeeper
Omar Doom, American actor
Omar Epps, American actor
Omar Espinosa, American musician
Omar Faruk Tekbilek (born 1951), Turkish virtuoso flutist and multi-instrumentalist
Omar Muhamoud Finnish, Somali faction leader based in Mogadishu
Omar Gooding, American actor
Omar Hammayil (b. 1976/77), mayor of Al-Bireh in the West Bank in the Palestinian territories.
Omar ibn al-Khattab, more commonly spelled Umar ibn al-Khattab, the second Rashidun caliph of Islam; father of the prophet Muhammad's wife Hafsa bint Umar
Omar ibn Said (1770–1864), West African/American scholar
Omar Infante, second baseman for the Kansas City Royals
Omar Khadr, Canadian youth controversially convicted under the Military Commissions Act of 2009 of murder in violation of the law of war and providing material support for terrorism
Omar Khairat (born 1949), Egyptian pianist & musician, founder of the Egyptian Conservatory institution
Omar Khayyam (1048–1131), Persian poet and scientist
Omar Kiam (1894-1954), American fashion and costume designer
Omar Lulu, Indian film director of Malayalam cinema
Omar Lye-Fook (known professionally as Omar, born 1968), British soul singer and musician
Omar Mascarell, Spanish football player
Omar Haji Massale, commander of the Somali military
Omar Mateen, the gunman in the Orlando nightclub shooting
Omar McLeod, Jamaican hurdler
Omar Meña, Cuban track and field sprinter
Omarr Morgan (born 1976), cornerback playing for the Saskatchewan Roughriders of the Canadian Football League
Omar Mukhtar, leader of the resistance movement against the Italian military occupation of Libya
Omar Naber, Slovenian singer
Omar Yoke Lin Ong, co-founder of Malaysian Chinese Association, Malaysian Chinese who converted to Islam
Omar Pasha (1806–1871), Serbian or Croatian Ottoman general
Omar Pineiro (born 1997), American rapper
Omar Pinzón, Colombian backstroke swimmer
Omar Pound (1926–2010), British author, son of Dorothy Shakespear and Ezra Pound
Omar al-Qattan (born 1964), Palestinian-British film director and film producer
Ómar Ragnarsson, Icelandic media personality and activist for nature and environment
Omar Rodríguez-López, lead guitarist and composer of The Mars Volta and former guitarist of At the Drive-In
Omar Ali Saifuddin I (died 1795), Sultan of Brunei from 1762 until 1795
Omar Ali Saifuddin II (died 1852), Sultan of Brunei from 1829 to 1852
Omar Ali Saifuddien III (1914–1986), Sultan of Brunei from 1950 to 1967
Omar Saidou Tall, 19th century West African political leader
Omar Samra, first Egyptian to climb Mount Everest
Omar Al Saqqaf (1923–1974), Saudi Arabian diplomat and politician
Omar Sey (born 1941), Gambian politician
Omar Sharif, Academy Award nominated Egyptian actor
Omar Sivori, former international Argentine and Italian football player
Omarr Smith (born 1977), American football defensive back for the San Jose SaberCats
Omar Suleiman (1936–2012), Egyptian "minister without portfolio" and director of the Egyptian General Intelligence Services (EGIS)
Omar Sy (born 1978), French actor
Omar Torrijos, Commander of the Panamanian National Guard and the de facto leader of Panama from 1968 to 1981
Omar Vizquel, Major League Baseball shortstop playing for the Toronto Blue Jays
Omar Vrioni (fl. 1821), leading Ottoman figure in the Greek War of Independence
Omar Pasha Vrioni II (1839–1928), Albanian prime minister and diplomat
Omar Zepeda, Mexican race walker

Middle name
Abu Saeed Muhammad Omar Ali (1919–2012), Bangladeshi Islamic scholar and translator
Abuzed Omar Dorda (born 1944), prime minister of Libya from 1990 to 1994, and Libya's permanent representative to the U.N. from 1997 to 2003
Gabriel Omar Batistuta, former international Argentine football player
Mohamed Omar Habeb Dhere, Somali faction leader based in Jowhar
Sergio Omar Almirón, former international Argentine football player

Fictional characters
Omar ben Salaad, a sheikh in The Adventures of TinTin

Omer
Omer Adam (born 1993), Israeli singer
Omer Arbel, Canadian architect and designer
Omer Atzili (born 1993), Israeli footballer
Omer Avital (born 1971), Israeli-American jazz bassist, composer and bandleader
Omer (Book of Mormon), Jaredite king in the Book of Mormon
Omer Bar-Lev (born 1953), Israeli politician
Omer Bartov (born 1954), Israeli-American professor
Omer Buchsenbaum (born 1982), Israeli footballer
Omer N. Custer (1873–1942), American politician
Omer Damari (born 1989), Israeli footballer
Omer Elmas (born 1968 or 1969), Turkish wrestler
Omer Fadida (born 1990), Israeli footballer
Omer Golan (born 1982), Israeli footballer
Omer Hussain (born 1984), Scottish cricketer
Omer Meir Wellber (born 1981), Israeli conductor
Omer Nachmani (born 1993), Israeli footballer
Omer Peretz (born 1986), Israeli footballer
Omer Peretz (born 1990), Israeli footballer
Omer Reingold (born 1969), Israeli computer scientist
Omer Riza, British footballer of Turkish origin
Omer Shapira (born 1994), Israeli racing cyclist
Omer Stokes Jackson (1884-1940), American politician
Omer Tchalisher (born 1993), Israeli footballer
Omer Vered (born 1990), Israeli footballer
Saint Omer, or Saint Audomar, bishop of Thérouanne in northern France

Ómar 

 Ómar Ragnarsson (born 16 September 1940), Icelandic media personality and nature activist
 Friðrik Ómar Hjörleifsson  (born 4 October 1981), Icelandic singer representing Iceland in Eurovision Song Contest 2008, vocalist for Eurobandið

Ömer
Besim Ömer Akalın (1862–1940), Turkish physician and politician
Ömer Akgün (born 19982), Turkish sport shooter
Ömer Aşık (born 1986), Turkish professional basketball player
Ömer Boncuk (1917–1988), Turkish footballer
Ömer Çelik (born 1968), Turkish politician and government minister
Ömer Erdoğan, Turkish-German footballer
Ömer Güleryüz, Turkish amputee football player
Ömer Halisdemir (1974–2016), Turkish non-commissioned officer
Ömer Kavur (1944–2005), Turkish film director, producer and screenwriter
Ömer Kemaloğlu (born 1987), Turkish karateka
Ömer Özkan (born 1971), Turkish plastic surgeon
Ömer Seyfettin (1884–1920), Turkish nationalist writer
Ömer Can Sokullu, Turkish footballer
Ömer Naci Soykan, Turkish philosopher
Ömer Yurtseven (born 1998), Turkish basketball player

Oumar
Oumar Barro (born 1974), Burkinabé (from Burkina Faso) footballer
Oumar Dieng (born 1972), Senegalese footballer
Oumar Diouck (born 1994), Senegalese-born Belgian footballer
Oumar Kalabane (born 1981), Guinean footballer
Oumar Loum (born 1973), Senegalese athlete who competes in the 200 metres
Oumar Mariko (born 1959), Malian doctor, politician and noted former student activist
Oumar Niasse (born 1990), Senegalese footballer
Oumar Sène (born 1959), former Senegalese football midfielder
Oumar Tchomogo (born 1978), Beninese football player
Oumarou Ganda (1935–1981), Nigerian director and actor

Umar
Abadir Umar Ar-Rida (fl. 13th century), Somali Sheikh and saint of Harar
Abû 'Umar ibn Sa'îd (died c. 1287), the last ra’îs of Manûrqa (1282–1287)
Al-Muzaffar Umar (died 1191), Ayyubid prince of Hama and a general of Saladin
Ghali Umar Na'Abba (born 1964), Nigerian businessman and politician
Umar Abdulmutallab, Nigerian al-Qaeda member known as the Christmas Bomber
Malik Umar Hayat Khan (1875–1944), soldier of the Indian Empire, one of the largest landholders in the Punjab, and an elected member of the Council of the State of India
Mifta al-Usta Umar (born 1935), former Head of State of Libya from 15 February 1984 to 7 October 1990
Sanjar Umarov (born 1956), prominent Uzbek politician and businessman
Sitta Umaru Turay (born 1978), Sierra Leonean journalist and member of the editorial Board of the Sierra Express newspaper
Umar I, or Umar ibn al-Khattab, the second Rashidun caliph of Islam; father of the prophet Muhammad's wife Hafsa bint Umar
Umar II, or Umar ibn Abd al-Aziz, Umayyad caliph
Umar al-Aqta, (fl. 830s–863), emir of Melitene
Umar Akmal, (born 1990) Pakistani cricketer
Umar Alisha (born 1966), 9th peethadhipathi of Sri Viswa Viznana Vidya Adhyatmika Peetham
Umar Arteh Ghalib (born 1930), prominent Somali politician and a former prime minister of Somalia
Umar Bhatti (born 1984), Pakistani-born Canadian cricketer
Umar Dimayev (1908–1972), Chechen musician
Umar Din (ruled 1526–1553), sultan of Adal
Umar Gul, (born 1984), Pakistani former cricketer
Umar ibn Abd al-Aziz, or Umar II, Umayyad caliph
Umar ibn Hafsun, 9th century leader of rebel forces in the Caliphate of Córdoba
Umar ibn al-Khattab, or Umar I, the second Rashidun caliph of Islam; father of the prophet Muhammad's wife Hafsa bint Umar
Umar ibn Marwan ibn al-Hakam, the son of the fourth Umayyad caliph Marwan I; ruled for less than a year in 684–685
Umar ibn Sa'ad (c. 620–680), one of the leaders of the troops who killed the prophet Muhammad's grandson Husayn ibn Ali in the Battle of Karbala in 680
Umar ibn Uthman, a son of the third caliph Uthman
Umar Johnson (born 1974), American Pan-Africanist
Umar Kayam (1932–2002), Indonesian sociologist
Umar Muhammad (born 1975), American football player
Umar Mustafa al-Muntasir (1939–2001), prime minister of Libya from 1 March 1987 to 7 October 1990 and foreign minister from 1992 to 2000
Umar of Borno (died 1881), Sheikh of the Kanem-Bornu Empire
Umar Patek (born 1970), Indonesian involved in 2002 Bali Bombing
Umar Shaikh Mirza I (1356–1394), son of the Central Asian conqueror Timur
Umar Shaikh Mirza II (1456–1494), Timurid king of Ferghana and father of Babur, founder of the Mughal Empire in India
Umar Tall (c. 1797–1864), West African scholar and military commander
Umar Wirahadikusumah (1924–2003), Vice-President of Indonesia from 1983 to 1988

Umaru
Umaru Bangura (born 1987), Sierra Leonean international footballer
Umaru Dikko (born 1936), Nigerian politician
Umaru Mutallab (born 1939), played a major role in introducing Islamic banking into Nigeria
Umaru Pulavar (born 1642), Tamil Muslim poet
Umaru Rahman (born 1982), Sierra Leonean international footballer
Umaru Yar'Adua (1951–2010), the 2nd President of Nigeria's Fourth Republic

Other
Omarion (born 1984), American R&B singer, actor, songwriter, record producer, dancer
Omarr Smith (born 1977), American football defensive back for the San Jose SaberCats
Oumarou Ganda (1935–1981), Nigerian director and actor
Umer Shareef (born 1948), Pakistani stand-up comedian, stage, film and television actor, writer, director and producer
Umur the Lion (died 1348), the Turkish Emir of Aydin from 1336 to 1344

Surname

Omar
Adil Omar (born 1991), Pakistani hip-hop artist
Ayesha Omar, Pakistani actress and singer 
Don Omar (born 1978), Puerto Rican rapper (full name "William Omar Landrón Rivera")
Elyas Omar (1936–2018), third Mayor of Kuala Lumpur, Malaysia
Hairuddin Omar (born 1979), Malaysian professional footballer
Ilhan Omar (born 1981), Somali-American U.S. Representative for Minnesota's 5th congressional district
Mahmoud Abdel Salam Omar, Egyptian businessman
Mohammed Omar (1960–2013), Taliban leader of Afghanistan
Mohd Hamzani Omar (born 1978), Malaysian footballer
Nano Omar (born 1986), Swedish singer-songwriter

Omaar
Mohamed Abdullahi Omaar, Somali diplomat and politician
Rageh Omaar, Somali journalist and writer

Omer, Ömer
Abdisalam Omer, Somali economist and politician
Aihan Omer, Romanian handball coach
Atila Omer, American entrepreneur, co-founder of Collaborative Fusion

Oumar / Oumarou
Mamane Oumarou (born 1946), Nigerian political figure who served two brief periods as prime minister of Niger during the 1980s

Umar
Teuku Umar (c. 1854–1899), leader of Acehnese during the Aceh War
Yahya ibn Umar (died 864), Alid who rebelled against the Abbasid Caliphate

Omarova
Gulshat Omarova, Kazakh film director, actress and screen writer

See also
Omar (disambiguation)
Omar, a biblical figure
Omar (Vaishya), Hindu surname

References

Albanian masculine given names
Arabic masculine given names
Bosniak masculine given names
Iranian masculine given names
Pakistani masculine given names
Spanish masculine given names
Turkish masculine given names
Portuguese masculine given names
Hebrew masculine given names
Surnames of Somali origin
Arabic given names